Marlies Askamp (born August 7, 1970 in Dorsten, Recklinghausen, North Rhine-Westphalia) is a German professional basketball player. She was one of the original players to play in the U.S. Women's National Basketball Association (WNBA).

Personal
As a youth, Askamp played basketball and competed in track until at age 16. She speaks German, English, and French.

Career highlights
Played in the 1998 FIBA Women's Championship with the German National Team
All-time leader in offensive rebounds (137) and total rebounds (329) for the now-defunct Miami Sol

Career statistics

Regular season

|-
| style="text-align:left;"|1997
| style="text-align:left;"|Phoenix
| 28 || 1 || 18.5 || .393 || .000 || .763 || 5.2 || 0.8 || 0.8 || 0.3 || 1.6 || 7.5
|-
| style="text-align:left;"|1998
| style="text-align:left;"|Phoenix
| 26 || 0 || 12.3 || .471 || .000 || .661 || 3.3 || 0.5 || 0.5 || 0.3 || 0.9 || 5.3
|-
| style="text-align:left;"|1999
| style="text-align:left;"|Phoenix
| 30 || 30 || 26.0 || .482 || .000 || .816 || 7.2 || 0.8 || 0.7 || 0.6 || 1.2 || 9.4
|-
| style="text-align:left;"|2000
| style="text-align:left;"|Miami
| 32 || 32 || 27.2 || .407 || .500 || .684 || 7.2 || 0.9 || 0.5 || 0.7 || 1.5 || 7.8
|-
| style="text-align:left;"|2001
| style="text-align:left;"|Miami
| 30 || 11 || 14.4 || .483 || .000 || .563 || 2.9 || 0.5 || 0.4 || 0.4 || 0.6 || 2.5
|-
| style="text-align:left;"|2002*
| style="text-align:left;"|Miami
| 6 || 1 || 12.0 || .400 || .000 || .273 || 1.8 || 0.5 || 0.2 || 0.2 || 0.2 || 1.8
|-
| style="text-align:left;background:#afe6ba;"|2002*†
| style="text-align:left;"|Los Angeles
| 20 || 4 || 10.8 || .473 || .000 || .643 || 2.5 || 0.2 || 0.6 || 0.2 || 0.6 || 3.1
|-
| style="text-align:left;"|2002
| style="text-align:left;"|Total
| 26 || 5 || 11.0 || .462 || .000 || .480 || 2.3 || 0.3 || 0.5 || 0.2 || 0.5 || 2.8
|-
| style="text-align:left;"|Career
| style="text-align:left;"|6 years, 3 teams
| 172 || 79 || 18.6 || .440 || .167 || .711 || 4.8 || 0.6 || 0.6 || 0.4 || 1.1 || 6.0

Playoffs

|-
| style="text-align:left;"|1997
| style="text-align:left;"|Phoenix
| 1 || 0 || 19.0 || .333 || .000 || 1.000 || 2.0 || 1.0 || 0.0 || 1.0 || 0.0 || 9.0
|-
| style="text-align:left;"|1998
| style="text-align:left;"|Phoenix
| 5 || 0 || 7.2 || .400 || .000 || .250 || 2.4 || 0.2 || 0.0 || 0.2 || 0.6 || 1.8
|-
| style="text-align:left;background:#afe6ba;"|2002†
| style="text-align:left;"|Los Angeles
| 4 || 3 || 6.0 || .000 || .000 || 1.000 || 0.8 || 0.0 || 0.0 || 0.0 || 0.0 || 0.5
|-
| style="text-align:left;"|Career
| style="text-align:left;"|3 years, 2 teams
| 10 || 3 || 7.9 || .286 || .000 || .727 || 1.7 || 0.2 || 0.0 || 0.2 || 0.3 || 2.0

External links
 WNBA.com: Marlies Askamp Bio
 Old WNBA.com: Marles Askamp Bio at the Wayback Machine

1970 births
Living people
German expatriate basketball people in the United States
Centers (basketball)
Phoenix Mercury players
Miami Sol players
Los Angeles Sparks players
German women's basketball players
People from Dorsten
Sportspeople from Münster (region)